Thomas James (born 17 October 1988) is an English footballer who plays as a defender.

Playing career

Watford
Following some impressive displays for Stratford Town, James was signed by Football League Championship side Watford on 5 August 2011.

Tom played his one and only game for Watford in an FA Cup tie against Bradford City on 7 January 2012, he came on as an 85th-minute substitute for Mark Yeates, Watford won the game 4–2.

Tom James was informed he would be released by Watford when his contract expired on 30 June 2012, and would be joined by teammates Rene Gilmartin, Chez Isaac and Michael Bryan.

Daventry Town
Tom signed for Southern Football League Division One Central side Daventry Town on 25 October 2013.

James went on to make 33 league appearances for Daventry Town and scored one goal.

Tamworth
On 10 June 2014, Tom James signed for Conference North side Tamworth.

References

External links

1988 births
Living people
English footballers
Association football defenders
Atherstone Town F.C. players
Stratford Town F.C. players
Watford F.C. players
Nuneaton Borough F.C. players
Leamington F.C. players
Daventry Town F.C. players
Tamworth F.C. players
Hednesford Town F.C. players
Rugby Town F.C. players
English Football League players
National League (English football) players